Secret Royal Inspector & Joy is a 2021 South Korean television series starring Ok Taec-yeon and Kim Hye-yoon. It aired on tvN from November 8 to December 28, 2021. It is also available for streaming on iQIYI and Viu in selected territories.

Synopsis
Set in Joseon dynasty, it tells the story of a young gourmet who unintentionally becomes a royal inspector and a divorced woman who rushes to find happiness, as they team up to investigate and expose corrupt politicians.

Cast

Main
 Ok Taec-yeon as Ra Ian, an intelligent and unmarried 6th grade public service worker who wishes to open a small dumpling shop, but ends up becoming a secret royal inspector.
 Kim Hye-yoon as Kim Joy, a realist woman who is full of desire and passion, and believes that divorce can happen to anyone.

Supporting

People around Ra Ian
 Lee Joon-hyuk as Crown Prince Sohyeon
 Yang Hee-kyung as Madam Jo

People around Kim Joy
 Chae Won-bin as Hwang Bo-ri / Biryoung
 Nam Mi-jung as Jang Pat-sun
 Joo Jin-soo as Noh Chu-han

Secret royal investigators
 Min Jin-woong as Yook-chil
 Park Kang-seop as Goo-pal
 Lee Sang-hee as Kwang-soon

Gangbyeonsau
 Lee Jae-kyoon as Park Tae-seo
 Jung Soon-won as Cha Mal-jong
 Kim Hyun-joon as Ji Maeng-soo
 Park Shin-ah as Kang Han-gi

Rulers
 Jeong Bo-seok as Park Seung
 Jo Kwan-woo as King Injo
 Choi Tae-hwan as Park Do-soo

People in Kkori Island
 Bae Jong-ok as Deok-bong
 Ha Seung-jin as Ba-hoe

Extended
 Cha Yeop as Hong Seok-gi
 Kwon Oh-kyung

Special appearances
 Song Jong-ho as Jang Ki-wan
 Cha Hak-yeon as Choi Seung-yul

Production
 The series is formerly known as Tale of the Secret Royal Inspector and Joy. It is one of tvN's 15th anniversary special projects.
 The lead roles were first offered to actors Jo Byeong-kyu and Jung So-min.

Viewership

Notes

References

External links
  
 Secret Royal Inspector & Joy on iQIYI
 
 

Korean-language television shows
TVN (South Korean TV channel) television dramas
Television series by Studio Dragon
South Korean historical television series
South Korean comedy television series
Television series set in the Joseon dynasty
2021 South Korean television series debuts
2021 South Korean television series endings